The 1999 WNBA season was the second for the Washington Mystics. In the 1999 WNBA Draft, Chamique Holdsclaw was selected by the Washington Mystics 1st overall. In her first season, she was named the Rookie of the Year and was a starter in the inaugural WNBA All-Star Game.  She averaged 16.9 points and 7.9 rebounds per game in her first season.

Offseason

WNBA Draft

Regular season

Season standings

Season schedule

Player stats

Note: GP= Games played; MIN= Minutes; REB= Rebounds; AST= Assists; STL = Steals; BLK = Blocks; PTS = Points; AVG = Average

Chamique Holdsclaw ranked sixth in the WNBA in Free Throws, 116
Nikki McCray, ranked fifth in the WNBA in Free Throws, 129

Awards and honors
 Chamique Holdsclaw, WNBA Rookie of the Year Award
Chamique Holdsclaw, Forward, All-WNBA Second Team
Murriel Page, WNBA Peak Performer

References

External links
Washington Mystics on Basketball Reference

Washington Mystics
Washington Mystics seasons
Washington